Jean Thompson may refer to:

 Jean Kasem (born 1954), American actress
Jean Thompson (author) (born 1950), American author
 C. Jean Thompson (born 1940), New Zealand statistician
 Jean Thompson (athlete) (1910–1976), Canadian middle-distance runner
 Jean Helen Thompson (1926–1992), British statistician and demographer